Erica Gavin (born Donna Graff; July 22, 1947) is an American film actress best known for playing the title role in Russ Meyer's 1968 film Vixen!

Early years
Gavin was born in Los Angeles, California.  At age 19, she worked as a topless dancer in Hollywood with two other future Russ Meyer stars, Haji and Tura Satana. While waiting in a dentist's office, she saw an advertisement in Variety for girls to audition for the new Russ Meyer movie Vixen! She auditioned and won the role, which launched her to stardom in low budget, independent films, incorrectly called "B" films, which refer to a type of film made during the Studio Era.

Career
Following Vixen!, Gavin appeared in one more Russ Meyer film, Beyond the Valley of the Dolls, written by famed film critic Roger Ebert.  She also appeared in Jonathan Demme's women-in-prison film Caged Heat.

Personal life
Gavin currently resides in Los Angeles, California, where she works as a stylist and occasionally makes appearances at movie memorabilia conventions. She said in a 2006 interview that she is bisexual.

Filmography 
Initiation (1968) - Jan
Vixen! (1968) - Vixen Palmer
Beyond the Valley of the Dolls (1970) - Roxanne
Erika's Hot Summer (1971) - Erika
Godmonster of Indian Flats (1973) - Girl at bar
Caged Heat (1974) - Jacqueline Wilson
3 Stories About Evil (2008) - Mrs. Harris

References

External links 
Official site

An Interview With Erica Gavin at Rock! Shock! Pop!

American film actresses
Bisexual actresses
20th-century American women
1947 births
Living people
Actresses from Los Angeles
American bisexual actors
LGBT people from California
21st-century American women